Colonial period (a period in a country's history where it was subject to management by a colonial power) may refer to:

 Colonial Chile
 Spanish conquest of Guatemala
 Viceroyalty of Peru
 Colonial history of the United States
 British Raj, British colonial rule in India, 1858 to 1947
 British Hong Kong, British colonial rule in Hong Kong, 1841 to 1997 (excluding World War II)
 Colony of Ceylon (disambiguation)
 French Indochina, French colonial rule in Vietnam, Cambodia, and Laos
 French Algeria, French colonial rule in Algeria, 1830 to 1962

See also
 Colonialism
 Colonial era